Bowditch Field is the main public athletic facility for the City of Framingham, Massachusetts, USA.  It is located on Union Avenue midway between Downtown and Framingham Center. The facility houses a large multi-purpose football stadium that includes permanent bleachers on both sides of the field. The football field is home to the Framingham State University Rams football team and the Framingham High School Flyers football team. There is a baseball field (which is home to the Framingham State Rams and Framingham High Flyers Baseball teams), four tennis courts, two basketball courts, a track and field practice area, and the headquarters of the City Parks Department. Bowditch Field, along with Butterworth and Winch Parks, were all built during the Great Depression of the 1930s as Works Progress Administration projects.

References

External links
Construction updates

American football venues in Massachusetts
Athletics (track and field) venues in Massachusetts
Baseball venues in Massachusetts
Basketball venues in Massachusetts
Buildings and structures in Framingham, Massachusetts
Sports in Framingham, Massachusetts
Tennis venues in Massachusetts
Sports venues in Middlesex County, Massachusetts